The CSR50 is a  12.7×99mm NATO bolt-action precision rifle and Anti-materiel rifle. The gun uses a 7075 aluminum receiver and stock. It combines a capacity magazine with 10 rounds Barrett M82/M107A1. The barrel length is approximately 31. The gun weighs without the magazine 20.94 lb. (9.5 kg). It is built and developed by Caracal International.

Design and features 
The CSR 50 is a 12.7×99mm NATO bolt-action precision rifle, intended for long-range target engagement. Its solid, monolithic receiver and free-floating, heavy-contour, match-grade precision barrel ensure unparalleled precision in a lightweight package. Can be operated by both right and left hand shooters. It combines a high capacity magazine with the proven hard-hitting .50 BMG round to provide unmatched battlefield versatility as anti-material, as well as ultra-long range and counter-sniper platform. The fully adjustable buttstock increases carrying comfort and transportability in folded condition. Ambidextrous fire controls, safety, and magazine release, drastically improve ease of operation. Cheekpiece, butt plate and trigger position/weight are configurable by the operator.

Users 
 Seen in UAE, US joint military exercise.

References 

Anti-materiel rifles
Sniper rifles
Bolt-action rifles
Weapons of the United Arab Emirates
